Iwami Station is the name of two train stations in Japan:
 Iwami Station (Nara) (石見駅) - in Miyake, Shiki District, Nara Prefecture
 Iwami Station (Tottori) (岩美駅) - in Iwami, Iwami District, Tottori Prefecture